USS Sutton (DE-286) was a proposed United States Navy Rudderow-class destroyer escort that was never built.

Sources differ on Suttons planned builder; plans called for either Bethlehem-Hingham Shipyard at Hingham, Massachusetts or the Charleston Navy Yard at Charleston, South Carolina to build her. The contract for her construction was cancelled on 12 March 1944 before construction could begin.

The name Sutton was transferred to the destroyer escort USS Sutton (DE-771).

Notes

References 

NavSource Naval History: Photographic History of The U.S. Navy: Destroyer Escorts, Frigates, Littoral Warfare Vessels

Rudderow-class destroyer escorts
Cancelled ships of the United States Navy